Samuel Jack (1884 – after 1907) was a Scottish professional footballer who played as a forward.

References

1884 births
Scottish footballers
Association football forwards
Arthurlie F.C. players
Third Lanark A.C. players
Grimsby Town F.C. players
English Football League players
Year of death missing